The Collected Stories of Amy Hempel is a compilation of all Hempel's short stories published between 1985 and 2005. The collection was published by Scribner in 2006 with an introduction by Rick Moody. The book was a finalist for the 2006 PEN/Faulkner Award for Fiction and was selected by The New York Times Book Review as one of the 10 best books of 2006.

The collection includes Hempel's four previous collections: Reasons to Live (1985), At the Gates of the Animal Kingdom (1990), Tumble Home (1997), and The Dog of the Marriage (2005).

Contents

Foreword by Rick Moody: "On Amy Hempel"

Reasons to Live
 "In a Tub"
 "Tonight Is a Favor to Holly"
 "Celia Is Back"
 "Nashville Gone to Ashes"
 "San Francisco"
 "In the Cemetery Where Al Jolson Is Buried"
 "Beg, Sl Tog, Inc, Cont, Rep"
 "Going"
 "Pool Night"
 "Three Popes Walk into a Bar"
 "The Man in Bogotá"
 "When It's Human Instead of When It's Dog"
 "Why I'm Here"
 "Breathing Jesus"
 "Today Will Be a Quiet Day"

At the Gates of the Animal Kingdom
 "Daylight Come"
 "The Harvest"
 "The Most Girl Part of You"
 "Rapture of the Deep"
 "Du Jour"
 "Murder"
 "The Day I Had Everything"
 "To Those of You Who Missed Your Connecting Flights Out of O'Hare"
 "And Lead Us Not into Penn Station"
 "In the Animal Shelter"
 "At the Gates of the Animal Kingdom"
 "The Lady Will Have the Slug Louie"
 "Under No Moon"
 "The Center"
 "Tom-Rock Through the Eels"
 "The Rest of God"

Tumble Home
 "Weekend"
 "Church Cancels Cow"
 "The Children's Party"
 "Sportsman"
 "Housewife"
 "The Annex"
 "The New Lodger"
 "Tumble Home"
 "Notes"

The Dog of the Marriage
 "Beach Town"
 "Jesus Is Waiting"
 "The Uninvited"
 "Reference #388475848-5"
 "What Were the White Things?"
 "The Dog of the Marriage"
 "The Afterlife"
 "Memoir"
 "Offertory"
 "Notes"

References

American short story collections
2006 short story collections
PEN/Faulkner Award for Fiction-winning works